Revenge of the Living Dead Girls is a 1987 French splatter film directed by Pierre B. Reinhard, written by Jean-Claude Roy, and starring Véronique Catanzaro, Kathryn Charly, Sylvie Novak, Anthea Wyler, Laurence Mercier, Patrick Guillemin, Gabor Rassov, Christina Schmidt, and Cornélia Wilms. Toxic waste causes a zombie outbreak in France.

Plot 
In France, the CEO of a chemical company looks to cheaply dispose of their plant's chemical waste. He and his secretary come up with the idea to dump it illegally. When the secretary contaminates a milk tanker, it causes several deaths in the town. The toxic waste, illegally dumped in a nearby graveyard, then causes the recently dead townspeople to rise as ravenous zombies, who seek revenge on the unscrupulous company and its employees.

Cast 
 Véronique Catanzaro
 Kathryn Charly
 Sylvie Novak
 Anthea Wyler
 Laurence Mercier
 Patrick Guillemin
 Gabor Rassov
 Christina Schmidt
 Cornélia Wilms

Release 
Revenge of the Living Dead Girls premiered in France on 16 September 1987.  It was released on DVD on 8 August 2006.

Reception 
Dave Bow of The Portland Mercury rated it 2/4 stars and wrote that story is confused and the ending makes no sense.  Peter Schorn of IGN rated it 2/10 and called it a weak ripoff of The Return of the Living Dead.  Ian Jane of DVD Talk rated it 3/5 stars and called it "an entertaining slice of European sleaze".

References

External links 
 

1987 films
1987 horror films
French horror films
French splatter films
French zombie films
1980s French films